The Power of Positive Thinking is an EP by Canadian punk rock band Nomeansno. "I Am Wrong" and "Life in Hell" were both new tracks while "Manic Depression" was a Jimi Hendrix cover recorded in 1985 and remixed for release on the EP.

Track listing
 "I Am Wrong"
 "Manic Depression" (Jimi Hendrix cover)
 "Life in Hell"

Personnel
Craig  Bougie – Live Sound
Cec English – Producer (Tracks 1 & 3)
Andy Kerr – Guitar, Vocals
Greg Reely – Producer (Track 2)
John Wright – Drums, Vocals
Rob Wright – Bass, Vocals
John Yates – Artwork

Nomeansno albums
1990 EPs
Alternative Tentacles EPs